Scaramouche (1923) is a silent swashbuckler film based on the 1921 novel Scaramouche by Rafael Sabatini, directed by Rex Ingram, released by Metro Pictures, and starring Ramon Novarro, Alice Terry, Lewis Stone, and Lloyd Ingraham.

Scaramouche became public domain in the United States on January 1, 2019.

Plot

André-Louis Moreau loves Aline de Kercadiou, the niece of his godfather, Quintin de Kercadiou, and she him. However, Quintin would prefer she married the Marquis de la Tour d'Azyr, a middle-aged nobleman, rather than someone who does not even know who his parents are.

One day, expert swordsman de la Tour first toys with, then kills André's friend Philippe de Vilmorin in a duel. André turns to the King's Lieutenant for justice. However, when the official learns who the accused is, he immediately orders André's arrest. André flees.

Meanwhile, France nears the brink of revolution. When one orator in favor of liberty and equality is shot down by a soldier, André fearlessly takes his place and remains undaunted when he is grazed by a bullet. When the dragoons are called out to disperse the mob, an admirer named Chapelier helps André escape.

He joins a wandering theatre troupe led by Challefau Binet. André writes better plays for them to perform, and they become very successful, eventually performing at a theatre in Paris. André becomes engaged to Binet's daughter, Climène.

Aline and de la Tour attend a performance of his latest work, however, and she and André spot each other. She goes to see him, but he does not wish to renew their relationship. De la Tour, despite loving Aline, cannot help trifling with Climène. By chance, Aline and Countess de Plougastel, with whom she is staying, see him in a carriage with Climène. Aline informs de la Tour she never wants to see him again. De la Tour blackmails the countess into helping him, reminding her of an incident in her past.

Meanwhile, in the National Assembly, the aristocrats, unable to effectively respond to the reform-minded delegates with words, resort to duels to eliminate their leading opponents. Chief among the duelists is de la Tour. In desperation, Danton and Chapelier recruit André to reply in kind. The Chevalier de Chabrillone is his first victim. Eventually, he gets what he wants: a duel with de la Tour. He disarms his foe, then allows him to pick up his sword. After André wounds the nobleman in his sword arm, de la Tour gives up.

When news reaches Paris that the Austrians and Prussians have invaded France in support of the beleaguered King Louis XVI, the French Revolution erupts. In the fighting, de la Tour is overwhelmed and left for dead. When he revives, he staggers to the residence of the countess. André heads there too, to rescue his love and his mother the countess (whose identity has been revealed to him by de Kercadiou), armed with a passport signed by Danton authorizing him to do anything he wants. When the two bitter enemies spot each other, de la Tour demands the passport. André refuses, whereupon de la Tour draws a pistol. When the countess reveals that he is in fact André's father, the two men have an initially uneasy reconciliation. When de la Tour starts to leave, André offers him his sword. Thus armed, de la Tour faces the rioters in the street and perishes.

André places the two women in a covered carriage. At the Paris gate, a man spots the aristocrats inside and demands they be handed over to the mob. Moreau pleads with them to let them go for his sake. The masses respond with extravagant sentimentality, and the trio are allowed to leave Paris.

Cast
 Lloyd Ingraham as Quintin de Kercadiou
 Alice Terry as Aline de Kercadiou, his niece
 Ramon Novarro as André-Louis Moreau, his godson
 Lewis Stone as The Marquis de la Tour d'Azyr
 Julia Swayne Gordon as The Countess [Thérèse] de Plougastel
 William Humphrey as The Chevalier de Chabrillone
 Otto Matieson as Philippe de Vilmorin
 George Siegmann as Danton
 Bowditch M. Turner as Chapelier
 James Marcus as [Challefau] Binet
 Edith Allen as Climène Binet
 John George as Polichinelle
 Willard Lee Hall as The King's Lieutenant
 Rose Dione as La Révolte

Uncredited cast:
 Edwin Argus as King Louis XVI
 J. Edwin Brown as Monsieur Benoit
 Louise Carver as Member of Theatre Audience
 Edward Connelly as Minister to the King

Production
Scaramouche was an elaborate and unwieldy production that suffered from delays and cost overruns. Ingram had secured the rights to Sabatini's novel in September 1922, and worked on the project for seven months before the cameras rolled. Extensive outdoor sets, representing 18th-century Paris, were built both on the Metro lot and at a separate site in the San Fernando Valley, and 1,500 extras were used. An experimental sequence was shot in Technicolor, with the Technicolor company picking up the tab; the sequence proved unsatisfactory and was ultimately discarded.

Release
Scaramouche was given a prestigious 22-unit roadshow release upon its completion in 1924. The film was financially successful in the United States and broke box-office records in Paris and London.

Home media
Since March 24, 2009, it has been available on DVD from the Warner Archive Collection.

References

External links
 
 
 
 
 
 Poster for Scaramouche

1923 films
American romantic drama films
American silent feature films
American black-and-white films
Films based on British novels
Films directed by Rex Ingram
Films set in Paris
French Revolution films
Cultural depictions of Georges Danton
Cultural depictions of Louis XVI
1923 romantic drama films
1920s adventure drama films
American adventure drama films
1920s historical adventure films
American historical adventure films
Metro Pictures films
Surviving American silent films
1920s American films
Silent romantic drama films
Silent historical adventure films
Silent American drama films